Dzhanibek Nanakovich Golaev (1917  26 September 1943) was a Karachay flying ace in the Soviet Air Forces. Killed in action on the Eastern Front of the World War II, he was posthumously awarded the title of the Hero of the Russian Federation in 1995.

Early life 
Golaev was born in 1917 in  aul (village) of Batalpashinsky otdel, Kuban Oblast (located within — Karachay-Cherkessia). He was conscripted in 1938. Golaev completed training as a pilot, graduating on 18 June 1941.

World War II 
Since August 1942, Golaev was in frontline service. He participated in the Battle of Kursk (63 missions). He took part in 23 air battles, shot down 9 planes. Later he participated in the Battle of the Dnieper, in the battle that happened on September 9, 1943, he shot down four planes. He was wounded twice. On September 25, 1943, he died. It happened when Soviet aerodrome near Pryluky was bombed. Golaev tried to put out the planes. He was buried in a mass grave on the central square of Pryluky

To the moment of death, Golaev was in command of a squadron of 32nd Fighter Aviation Regiment of 256th Fighter Aviation Division of 2nd Air Army. In total, he participated in 102 war missions, 39 air battles, shot down 15 planes. Because of nationality, as some sources think, Golaev didn't become Hero of the Soviet Union.

Honours 

 Presidential degree of September 7, 1995 awarded Golaev title of the Hero of the Russian Federation, for «bravery and heroism that he has shown in fighting against German-fascist invaders in the Great Patriotic war of 1941-1945». The award was bestowed posthumously.
 He also was awarded the Order of the Red Banner and Order of the Red Star.

Commemoration 

See also 

 List of Heroes of the Russian Federation

References 

1917 births
1943 deaths
Heroes of the Russian Federation
Recipients of the Order of the Red Banner
Soviet World War II flying aces
Soviet military personnel killed in World War II
Deaths by airstrike during World War II